The Season 3 World Championship was an esports tournament for the multiplayer online battle arena video game League of Legends. It was the third iteration of the League of Legends World Championship held by Riot Games, and the last iteration not to be formally titled after the year it took place.

SK Telecom T1 defeated Royal Club 3–0 in the finals and took their first championship.

Teams 

 14 teams participate
 Four teams receive direct entry into Quarter-finals through top 4 of All-Star Shanghai 2013.
 Seed #1 from China, South Korea, North America, and Taiwan/Hong Kong/Macau

Group stage 

 Ten teams are drawn into two groups with five teams in each group based on their seeding. Teams of the same region cannot be placed in the same group (excepted seed #3 of Europe is Gambit Gaming).
 Double round robin, all matches are best-of-one.
 If teams have the same win–loss record and head-to-head record, a tiebreaker match is played for second place.
 Top two teams of each group will advance to Playoff stage. Bottom three teams are eliminated.

Group A

Group B

Playoff stage 

 Eight teams are drawn into a single elimination bracket.
 Quarterfinals matches are best-of-three, Semifinals and Final match are best-of-five.
 The auto-qualified team is drawn against the team from Group stage.
 Teams from same group will be on opposite sides of the bracket, meaning they cannot play each other until the Finals.

Final standings

Team Ranking

Viewership and attendance
The 2013 World Championship final was watched over Twitch by over 32 million people, with a peak of 8.5 million concurrent views, a large increase from the 2012 finals of 8.2 million viewers, with 1.1 millions peak concurrent ones. The numbers shattered the previous records for any eSports event. These numbers were much higher than those of other competitor eSports events for Dota 2 and Starcraft 2, the former of which only reached one million concurrent viewers.

Riot's 8.5 million concurrent viewers is on a par with the "more than 8 million" people that watched Felix Baumgartner's jump from the edge of space. Exact figures for streaming events are difficult to ascertain, but All Things D reports that Baumgartner's jump was "web video's biggest event ever."

League of Legends is by far the biggest entity in the pro-gaming sector, regularly outstripping the stream viewer numbers of its major competitors, including Valve's Dota 2 and Blizzard's StarCraft II. In context, Valve's flagship Dota 2 tournament — The International 3 — took place two months before the League of Legends Season 3 World Championship finals and reached one million concurrent viewers.

References

External links 
 Information

2013 in American sports
2013 in esports
2013 League of Legends World Championship
2013 in Los Angeles
2013 multiplayer online battle arena tournaments